Beloved is the fourth album by Japanese rock/pop band Glay. It was released on November 18, 1996, and peaked at #1 at Oricon charts, with 1,522,540 copies sold. The album was certified "Million" by the Recording Industry Association of Japan (RIAJ).

Track listing 
Groovy Tour - 6:12
Lovers Change Fighters, Cool - 3:59
Beloved - 4:45
 - 3:26
Fairy Story - 4:06
 - 6:52
Hit the World Chart! - 5:29
 - 4:52
 - 5:02
 - 5:34
 - 5:03
Rhapsody - 5:18

References 
 Beloved page at Oricon

External links 
 Glay Official Site

1996 albums
Glay albums